The Republic Institute for Health Protection is the national public health agency of the Republic of North Macedonia. It was founded in 1924. It is legally responsible for monitoring the health of the population and infectious diseases and for advising the Ministry of Health. It has more than 200 employees.

References

Medical and health organizations based in North Macedonia
Government health agencies